Carol Ann Stepien is an American ecologist at the National Museum of Natural History of the Smithsonian Institution. She was elected a fellow of the American Association for the Advancement of Science in 2016.

Education and career
Stepien has a B.S. from Bowling Green University and an M.S. from the University of Southern California. She earned her Ph.D. in 1985 working on Chironemus. She did postdoctoral work with Richard Heinrich Rosenblatt at Scripps Institution of Oceanography and David Hillis at the University of Texas at Austin. In 1992 she joined the faculty at Case Western Reserve University where she remained until 2000. She then moved to Cleveland State University and held a position there until 2014. Concurrently, she joined the University of Toledo in 2004, and was appointed Distinguished University Professor in 2012. She was Director of the Lake Erie Research Center from 2004 until 2016. In 2016, she moved to the National Oceanic and Atmospheric Administration (NOAA) where she led the Pacific Marine Biological Laboratory's Ocean Environment Research Division Leader until 2021. Starting in 2017, she became a research associate at National Museum of Natural History.

Research 
Stepien's research centers on the genetics and genomics of marine and freshwater fishes and invertebrates. Her early research examined genetic divergence in fish, and the population genetics of walleye, bivalves, and rockfish. She is interested in the population genetics and evolutionary patterns of invasive species, and has used genetic tools to study invasive species such as the zebra mussel and quagga mussel. Her research on the goby fish centered on comparisons of goby fish populations from North American and Eurasia. She has also examined viral hemorrhagic septicemia, viruses that cause disease in finfish and has developed new techniques to track the virus. She has also used metabarcoding to track invasive species. She also is working with collaborators to apply eDNA biotechnology for monitoring and assessing marine and aquatic biological community dynamics using eDNA collected remotely from buoys, drones, AUVs, and gliders.

Selected publications

Awards and honors 
In 2010, she was awarded the Sigma Xi Scientific Society's Outstanding Researcher award. In 2016, Stepien elected a fellow of the American Association for the Advancement of Science (AAAS) who cited her “for distinguished contributions to the fields of molecular evolutionary ecology and conservation genetics, particularly invasive and native populations, and mentorship of graduate and undergraduate students”.

References

External links 

1958 births
Living people
University of Toledo faculty
American ecologists
Women ecologists
University of Southern California alumni
Fellows of the American Association for the Advancement of Science
National Oceanic and Atmospheric Administration personnel